Langtang Ri is a mountain in the Langtang Himal of the Himalayas. At an elevation of  it is the 106th highest mountain in the world. Located on the border between the Bagmati Zone of Nepal and Tibet, China, it is part of a group of high peaks that include Shishapangma (8,013 m) and Porong Ri (7,292 m).

Langtang Ri was first climbed on 10 October 1981 by a Japanese expedition.

See also
 List of mountains in China
 List of mountains in Nepal

References

Mountains of Tibet
China–Nepal border
International mountains of Asia
Seven-thousanders of the Himalayas
Mountains of the Bagmati Province